The Hohe Bühl is a hill in the northern Palatine Forest in the German state of Rhineland-Palatinate, with a height of .

The hill straddles the parishes of Enkenbach-Alsenborn to the west and Carlsberg to the east and there is a small viewing tower at the top of its domed summit. The A 6 motorway from Saarbrücken to Mannheim runs past the top of the hill just to the south; this is the highest point on the motorway.
Two kilometres downstream it is impounded to form the Eiswoog lake.

Mountains and hills of Rhineland-Palatinate
Mountains and hills of the Palatinate Forest